Events in the year 2018 in Mozambique.

Incumbents
 President: Filipe Nyusi
 Prime Minister: Carlos Agostinho do Rosário

Events
Since 2017 – Ongoing conflict in the Cabo Delgado Province, between Islamist militant group Ansar al-Sunna and Mozambican security forces

Sports 
29 July to 5 August – Mozambique will host the 2018 FIBA Under-18 Women's African Championship

Deaths

3 May – Afonso Dhlakama, politician, leader of RENAMO (b. 1953).

References

 
2010s in Mozambique 
Years of the 21st century in Mozambique 
Mozambique 
Mozambique